Jehad Serwan Mostafa (born 28 December 1981) is an American-born alleged terrorist affiliated with the Jihadist group al Shabaab. Mostafa has been listed on the FBI Most Wanted List since 2011 due to his purported elevated position and prolific activity within the organization.

Biography 

Jehad Serwan Mostafa was born on December 28, 1981, in Waukesha, Wisconsin to a Syrian Kurdish man and an American mother, but he was raised and earned a degree in economics in San Diego, California. In his youth, he served as the head of the Muslim Youth Council of San Diego and later became a security guard under the California Bureau of Security and Investigative Services. Mostafa was born left handed with a noteworthy scar on his right hand. During his time in San Diego, he was described as "very kind, very peaceful, very patient" and as "not scary or aggressive".

In 2005, at the age of twenty-four, Mostafa traveled to Yemen before further traveling to live in Somalia where he joined the Jihadist militant group al Shabaab. Mostafa swiftly rose up the ranks of the group, serving as an explosives expert, propaganda expert, military instructor, and interpreter for the organization. He rose to a height in prominence within the organization in 2009 and is currently believed to be the number one most influential United States citizen partnered with an overseas terrorist organization.

Mostafa is often referred to under the pseudonyms Emir Anwar, Ahmed Gurey, Anwar al-Amriki, Ahmed, Anwar, and Abu Abdullah al-Muhajir. According to an unnamed security force, he has three wives in Somalia, one being a widow of a former al Shabaab member, and an estimated sixteen children. According to the same source, he narrowly evaded capture in a ground operation around 2018.

Criminal Charges 

On October 9, 2009, Mostafa was charged by the United States with conspiracy to provide material support to terrorists, conspiracy to provide material support to a foreign terrorist organization, and providing material support to a foreign terrorist organization. In 2011, Mostafa was added to the FBI Most Wanted List. In 2022, The United States Department of State offered a ten million dollar reward to any individuals willing to divulge information surrounding Mostafa's whereabouts.

References 

1981 births
Living people
American people of Syrian descent
American people of Kurdish descent
Al-Shabaab (militant group) members
FBI: Most Wanted